Thomas Langmann (born 24 May 1971) is a French film producer and actor, known for producing The Artist (2011), for which he received an Academy Award for Best Picture as producer in 2012.

Career
Langmann began his career as an actor in his father's films when he was a teenager, earning Cesar Award nominations for Most Promising Newcomer for Les années sandwiches  in 1988 and Paris s'éveille in 1991, as well as a nomination for Best Supporting Actor in 1993 for Le nombril du monde. He became a film producer in the early 2000s. During the filming of Asterix at the Olympic Games, he was arrested for employing prostitutes and purchasing narcotics. In 2011, Langmann produced the black and white, silent film The Artist with director Michel Hazanavicius. He was unable to attract investors to the risky project and self-financed the film. He won the Academy Award for the film at the 2012 Oscars and won the Producers Guild of America Award for Best Theatrical Motion Picture. He was invited to join the Academy of Motion Picture Arts and Sciences in June 2012 along with 175 other individuals.

Personal life
Langmann was born in Paris, France, the son of Anne-Marie Rassam and film director Claude Berri. His uncle was the late producer Jean-Pierre Rassam and his brother was the late French actor Julien Rassam. Both his mother and his brother committed suicide, in 1997 and in 2002, respectively, while his father died of a stroke in 2009. He has a younger half-brother from his father's later relationship, Darius Langmann. His father Claude Berri was Jewish, and his mother Anne-Marie Rassam, who was born in Lebanon, was Lebanese Christian.

In 2008, Langmann was sentenced to four months in prison for assaulting his long-term girlfriend Frédérique, with whom he had a daughter in 2002. Langmann married French journalist Céline Bosquet on 21 June 2013.

Filmography

As producer
2002 Asterix & Obelix: Mission Cleopatra
2002 Dead Weight
2004 Blueberry
2004 Double zéro
2005 Foon
2006 Those Happy Days
2007 Steak
2008 Asterix at the Olympic Games (also director)
2008 Mesrine: Public Enemy #1
2008 Mesrine: Killer Instinct
2010 Le mac
2011 Mon père est femme de ménage
2011 The Artist
2011 La nouvelle guerre des boutons (War of the Buttons)
2012 The Suicide Shop
2012 Maniac
2012 Stars des années 80
2012 Colt 45
2014 The Search
2015 One Wild Moment
2016 Tout, tout de suite
2016 The Jews
2019 Quand on crie au loup

As actor
1980 Je vous aime
1988 Les années sandwiches
1989 Jour après jour
1989 Bille en tête
1990 Déminage (short)
1990 Alberto Express
1991 Night and Day
1991 Paris s'éveille
1992 Tous les garçons (short)
1992 Les paroles invisibles (short)
1992 Lover
1994 Le nombril du monde
1995 Court toujours: Joséphine et les gitans (short)
1995 La musique de l'amour: Robert et Clara
1997 Une femme très très très amoureuse
1998 Foul Play
2002 Dead Weight
2006 Days of Glory

Awards and nominations

References

External links

1971 births
Living people
French male film actors
French film producers
Male actors from Paris
Producers who won the Best Picture Academy Award
Filmmakers who won the Best Film BAFTA Award
Golden Globe Award-winning producers
French people of Lebanese descent
French people of Polish-Jewish descent
French people of Romanian-Jewish descent
Film directors from Paris